Lampela is a surname. Notable people with the surname include:

Jarmo Lampela (born 1964), Finnish film director and screenwriter
Seppo Lampela (born 1976), Finnish rap musician

See also
Lamela (surname)
Lampell